is a railway station located in the city of Kitakami, Iwate Prefecture, Japan, operated by the  East Japan Railway Company (JR East).

Lines
Yanagihara Station is served by the Kitakami Line, and is located 2.1 rail kilometers from the terminus of the line at Kitakami Station.

Station layout
Yanagihara Station has one side platforms serving a single bi-directional track. The station is unattended.

History
The station opened on May 15, 1963. The station was absorbed into the JR East network upon the privatization of the Japan National Railways (JNR) on April 1, 1987.

Surrounding area

See also
 List of railway stations in Japan

References

External links

 

Railway stations in Iwate Prefecture
Kitakami Line
Railway stations in Japan opened in 1963
Kitakami, Iwate
Stations of East Japan Railway Company